The delicate prinia (Prinia lepida) is a small warbler. This prinia is a resident breeder in southern Asia, from Turkey to North India.

There are 5 subspecies, of which  P. g. akyildizi, of southern Turkey is the darkest, brownest, and most heavily streaked above, and has the brightest buff flanks.

Taxonomy
A study published in 2021 concludes that the delicate prinia should be split from the graceful prinia.
 Prinia lepida, delicate prinia, 5 subspecies:
 Prinia lepida akyildizi, S Turkey,
 Prinia lepida irakensis, NE Syria, Iraq, SW Iran,
 Prinia lepida carpenteri, N Oman,
 Prinia lepida lepida, SE Iran, S Afghanistan, Pakistan, N India, C Nepal,
 Prinia lepida stevensi, SE Nepal, NE India, Bangladesh.
The International Ornithological Congress followed this change in an update later that year.

References

delicate prinia
Birds of the Middle East
Birds of South Asia
delicate prinia
Taxa named by Edward Blyth